The following are the national records in athletics in Bolivia maintained by its national athletics federation: Federación Atlética de Bolivia (FAB).

Outdoor

Key to tables:

h = hand timing

A = affected by altitude

Men

Women

Indoor

Men

Women

Notes

References
General
Bolivian Records 18 July 2021 updated
Specific

External links
FAB web site

Bolivia
Records
Athletics